Sister Pelagia is the heroine of a trilogy of mystery novels by Boris Akunin.

Sister Pelagia is a Russian Orthodox nun, acting as a girls' school teacher in the provincial town of Zavolzhsk  on the left bank of the Volga in Imperial Russia (a fictional town, which nevertheless takes its name from a real town in the modern Ivanovo Oblast, established 1934). No dates are given, but references to Sherlock Holmes, The Kreutzer Sonata, the Olympics and Marie Curie make it clear that the action is set in the late 1890s or in the early 1900s.

Sister Pelagia has an exceptional talent for deduction and acts under the orders of Bishop Mitrofanii of Zavolzhsk. The Bishop possesses a father-daughter relationship with Pelagia, which causes the two to often argue in a good natured manner. The Crown Prosecutor, an Orthodox convert from Judaism named Matvei Berdichevsky, is among the few who are completely aware of Pelagia's abilities. As is the Imperial Governor of Zavolzhsk, a German emigre named Baron Anton von Haggenau.

When needed for the investigation, the Bishop allows Pelagia the very unorthodox expedient of pretending to be her own sister, wear alluring female clothing and even flirt a bit with men - as long as it does not get to an actual violation of her vows,  

The first novel, Pelagia and the White Bulldog (US title: Sister Pelagia and the White Bulldog) (Пелагия и белый бульдог) is set in Zavolzhsk and the surrounding countryside. It centers around the arrival from St. Petersburg of an Inquisitor from the Holy Synod and the great evils that follow.

In the second novel, Pelagia and the Black Monk (US title: Sister Pelagia and the Black Monk) (Пелагия и черный монах), Pelagia investigates strange events in a remote island monastery in Mitrofanii's diocese (on the islands in the fictional Blue Lake). The plot contains many allusions to Umberto Eco's The Name of the Rose, Anton Chekhov's Black Monk, and several novels by Dostoevsky.

In Pelagia and the Red Rooster (US title: Sister Pelagia and the Red Cockerel) (Пелагия и красный петух), the action takes the reader from a steamboat on the Volga to Stroganovka, a fictional village near the Urals, and on to Jerusalem, an early Zionist commune in Megiddo and to Sodom. Events in Imperial Russia move to Zhytomyr and Saint Petersburg. The context is the flourishing millennialism and sectarianism in 19th century Imperial Russia.

External links
Full texts, in Russian, of Pelagia and the White Bulldog, Pelagia and the Black Monk, and Pelagia and the Red Rooster
Excerpt in English from Pelagia and the White Bulldog
Short review of Pelagia and the Black Monk
Pelagia bio at Clerical Detectives

Fictional Russian people in literature
Pelagia
Fictional historical detectives
Novel series by featured character
Novels by Boris Akunin
Pelagia
Characters in Russian novels of the 21st century